The flag of Ivanovo Oblast, in the Russian Federation, is a vertical bicolour of red and blue charged with the coat of arms of Ivanovo Oblast on the top and white waves on the bottom.

The flag was adopted on 3 March 1998, by the Duma of Ivanovo Oblast.

References

Flags displaying animals
Flag
Flags of the federal subjects of Russia
Flags introduced in 1998